Giacondo Turamini (died 1665) was a Roman Catholic prelate who served as Bishop of Pienza (1664–1665).

Biography
On 31 March 1664, Giacondo Turamini was appointed during the papacy of Pope Alexander VII as Bishop of Pienza.
He served as Bishop of Pienza until his death on 17 January 1665.

References

External links and additional sources
 (for Chronology of Bishops) 
 (for Chronology of Bishops) 

17th-century Italian Roman Catholic bishops
Bishops appointed by Pope Alexander VII
1665 deaths
Bishops of Pienza